The Last Robin Hood (French: Le dernier Robin des Bois) is a 1953 French comedy film directed by André Berthomieu and starring Roger Nicolas, Nicole Maurey and Lucien Nat. The film's sets were designed by the art director Paul-Louis Boutié.

Synopsis
A supervisor at a French summer camp entertains the children by dressing up as Robin Hood. When a young woman who lives in a nearby castle is kidnapped he goes to her rescue with the assistance of the children.

Cast
 Roger Nicolas as Ludovic Dubois
 Nicole Maurey as Isabelle Delorme
 Lucien Nat as 	Antoine Lévêque
 Luc Andrieux as 	Un complice
 Raoul Marco as Le principal
 Albert Michel as 	Un gendarme
 Michel Dumur as 	Un gosse 
 Jacques Gencel as 	Un gosse 
 Serge Lecointe as 	Un gosse
 Yves Derangère as Un gosse 
 Charles Bouillaud as Julien
 Henri Vilbert as L'inspecteur des douanes
 Paul Faivre as 	Gustave

References

Bibliography 
 Rège, Philippe. Encyclopedia of French Film Directors, Volume 1. Scarecrow Press, 2009.

External links 
 

1953 films
French comedy films
1953 comedy films
1950s French-language films
Films directed by André Berthomieu
1950s French films